Mansfield is a historic plantation house located near Petersburg, Dinwiddie County, Virginia. It was built in stages starting about 1750, and is a -story long and narrow frame dwelling with a hipped roof.  It has a hipped roof rear ell connected to the main house by a hyphen.  It features an octastyle Colonial Revival porch stretching the full length of the front facade.

It was listed on the National Register of Historic Places in 1976.

References

Plantation houses in Virginia
Houses on the National Register of Historic Places in Virginia
National Register of Historic Places in Dinwiddie County, Virginia
Houses completed in 1750
Houses in Dinwiddie County, Virginia